The Budac is a right tributary of the river Șieu in Romania. Its source is in the Călimani Mountains. It flows through the villages Budacu de Sus, Dumitrița, Orheiu Bistriţei and Budacu de Jos and discharges into the Șieu near Monariu.

References

Rivers of Romania
Rivers of Bistrița-Năsăud County